Indian Babu is a 2003 Indian Bollywood film directed by Lawrence D'Souza and produced by Surjit Pandher. It stars Jaz Pandher and Gurleen Chopra in pivotal roles. Cast also includes Johnny Lever, Alok Nath and Mukesh Rishi.

Plot
Dil (Gurleen Chopra) is getting engaged to Abhay Thakur (Rajat Gawda) against her wish. Suddenly she feels pain in her heart and it is discovered she has a hole in her heart. Abhay's uncle who is from London decides to send Dil to London for her treatment. There she meets Jeet (Jaz Pandher) and after a few meetings, they fall in love with each other. Later during a party, where Dil and Jeet are, Abhay Thakur comes there and Abhay's uncle announces that Abhay and Dil are engaged. Jeet becomes heartbroken. Abhay takes Dil back to India and starts preparing for the wedding. Jeet's father says go to India and get my daughter-in-law. Jeet's father sends a letter with Jeet to give to a woman. The woman was Jeet's real mother and she gave her son to the couple that lives in London because Abhay's father had misunderstandings with her. Jeet finds out and he then introduces Dil to her. Abhay's father warns Jeet's real mother to tell her son to stay away from Dil as she will marry his son. Jeet still goes and meets Dil. On the day of the wedding Jeet and Dil run away to get married in a temple where Jeet's London parents are there too. Unfortunately, Abhay and his father reach there and stop the wedding. Later when the Thankur is about to shoot Jeet, Thakur's sister-in-law comes in front and clears out the misunderstanding between everyone. Everyone there present watches Dil and Jeet get married.

Cast
 Jaz Pandher - Jeet
 Gurline Chopra - Dil Thakur/Dil Kuljeet Khurana, Abhay's ex-fiancee, Kuljeet's wife 
 Mukesh Rishi - Thakur Suraj Pratap Singh
 Johnny Lever - Mr. Patel/Principal (Patel Bond 008)
 Nishigandha Wad
 Alok Nath - Sharad Babu
 Rajat Gawda - Abhay Thakur
 Mohan Joshi - Karan, Abhay's uncle
 Debina Bonnerjee - Dil's step sister
 Avantika - Dil's step sister
 Shama Deshpande - Asha Sharma (Jeet's biological mother)

Soundtrack
The music of this movie was composed by Nadeem–Shravan, while the lyrics were written by Sameer. Songs of this movie became highly popular in eastern parts of India, especially in UP and Bihar.

References

External links
 

Indian drama films
2000s Hindi-language films
2003 films
Films scored by Nadeem–Shravan
Films directed by Lawrence D'Souza
2003 drama films
Hindi-language drama films